The UK Metric Association, or UKMA, is an advocacy group in the United Kingdom that argues for metrication in the United Kingdom and advocates the use of the metric system among the general public in the UK. UKMA argues that the continued use of two incompatible systems of measurement causes misunderstanding, confusion and mistakes, undermines consumer protection, wastes time during children's education, results in additional costs, and is against the national interest.

History

UKMA was founded by Chris Keenan in 1999 and formally associated in 2002 as an independent, non-party political, single-issue organisation. Later, an e-mail forum was started for supporters of metrication. In 2005, a website called ThinkMetric to help and encourage the general public to think in metric units was launched. In 2006, a blog called MetricViews was launched.

The current chair of UKMA is Peter Burke, and the secretary is Ronnie Cohen.  its patrons are Gavin Esler, Jim Al-Khalili, and Lord Taverne.

Strategies 
One of UKMA's strategies, aimed at getting their message to a wider audience including journalists and researchers, is to use Wikipedia as a conduit for their information. In an article in their December 2008 newsletter, members were urged to "correct any inaccuracies" in Wikipedia articles. It told about the "bias and inaccuracy" in metrication related articles, including Metrication in the United Kingdom, and highlighted the importance of "keeping an eye on them [metrication articles], visiting them regularly and checking that nobody has reversed any changes that you have made."

Campaigns
In February 2006, UKMA called for the government to set a date for the conversion of road signs from imperial to metric units.

Opposition

The aims of UKMA contrast with those of the British Weights and Measures Association (BWMA), which campaigns against compulsory Metrication in the United Kingdom and advocates the continued use of imperial measures.

See also
 Metric Martyrs – a group of English greengrocers who were convicted for using unapproved scales
 Metrication
 US Metric Association – the US metrication advocacy group that inspired the founding of the UKMA

References

External links
UK Metric Association website
UK Metric Association blog
UK Metric Association's ThinkMetric website

Metrication in the United Kingdom
Advocacy groups in the United Kingdom
1999 establishments in the United Kingdom
Organizations established in 1999